Australodynerus is an Australasian genus of potter wasps.

Taxonomy
Australodynerus Was first described as a genus in 1962 by the Italian entomologist Antonio Giordani Soika with  Odynerus pusillus, which had been described in 1856 by the Swiss entomologist Henri Louis Frédéric de Saussure, as its type species. The genus is classified within the tribe Odynerini in the subfamily Eumeninae, the potter wasps, part of the family Vespidae.

Species 
The following species are classified within the Australodynerus:
 Australodynerus bennettensis Borsato, 1996
 Australodynerus convexus  Giordani Soika, 1977
 Australodynerus flavoniger  Giordani Soika, 1977
 Australodynerus longicornis Borsato, 1996
 Australodynerus merredinensis Giordani Soika, 1977
 Australodynerus punctiventris Giordani Soika, 1977
 Australodynerus pusilloides Giordani Soika, 1962
 Australodynerus pusillus (de Saussure, 1856)
 Australodynerus rubignosus Borsato, 1996
 Australodynerus unipunctatus  Giordani Soika, 1993
 Australodynerus yanchepensis Giordani Soika, 1962

Characteristics
Australodynerus potter wasps are medium sized. They have an elongate mesosoma which is not quite cylindrical as it has a slight depression on the dorsal surface and it is slightly wider at the front than the rear. The postscutellum, has a short, horizontal surface dorsal which is not obviously separate from the angled posterior surface, which is part of the rear surface of the mesosoma.the proposed is elongated, flattened and has its dorsal surface extending onto its rear surface. There are well developed ridges along the sides and these are create right angles or acute angles where they join the lower ridges. The first tergite is wide and domed, as is the second but to a much lesser extent.

Distribution
Australodynerus potter wasps are endemic to Australia.

References

Potter wasps